is a Japanese baseball player.

Takashi Saito may also refer to:

, Japanese footballer
, Japanese sumo wrestler who died due to injuries sustained in the Tokitsukaze stable hazing scandal
, Japanese weightlifter
, Japanese author